The 48th Golden Helmet   was the 2008 version of the Golden Helmet organized by the Polish Motor Union (PZM). It took place on October 25 in the Olympic Stadium in Wrocław, Poland. Defending Winner is Grzegorz Walasek from Zielona Góra.

Original date of Final was October 17, but after canceled of German Grand Prix and restarted Final Grand Prix on October 18, Main Comminsion for Speedway Sport decided aboute change date. After resignations top riders, Main Commission decided that top three riders are automatically qualify for 2010 Speedway Grand Prix Qualification without Domestic Qualifications.

The Golden Helmet was won by Damian Baliński from Unia Leszno, who beat Jarosław Hampel (Unia Leszno also) and Adrian Miedziński (Unibax Toruń). It was first time in history, when Baliński won in Golden Helmet; in 2005 he was second. Hampel was third in 2003, and Miedziński never won medal in this competition.

Starting positions draw 

Main Commission for Speedway Sport (Główna Komisja Sportu Żużlowego, GKSŻ) which is a part of the Polish Motor Union nominated 20 riders (12+3 track reserve from Ekstraliga and 4+1 from First League). Rafał Dobrucki, Tomasz Jędrzejak and Norbert Kościuch later replaced the injured Adrian Gomólski, Tomasz Gapiński and Krzysztof Buczkowski. After changed of Final date, Janusz Kołodziej must resigned, because on October 24 he was started in friendly match United States vs. Rest of the world. A few days before The Final, Tomasz Gollob, Rune Holta, Rafał Dobrucki and Robert Kościecha resigned. Next riders who resigned was Krzysztof Kasprzak, Krzysztof Jabłoński, Tomasz Chrzanowski, Sebastian Ułamek and Wiesław Jaguś, Mariusz Węgrzyk, Marcin Rempała, Maciej Kuciapa and Patryk Pawlaszczyk.

Original riders 

 Krzysztof Kasprzak (Unia Leszno SSA)
 Adrian Gomólski (KM Ostrów)
 Tomasz Chrzanowski (Lotos Gdańsk)
 Adrian Miedziński (Unibax Toruń)
 Tomasz Gapiński (CKM Złomrex Włókniarz Częstochowa)
 Sebastian Ułamek (CKM Złomrex Włókniarz Częstochowa)
 Jarosław Hampel (Unia Leszno SSA)
 Tomasz Gollob (Caeleum Stal Gorzów)
 Damian Baliński (Unia Leszno SSA)
 Piotr Świderski (RKM Rybnik)
 Grzegorz Walasek (ZKŻ Kronopol Zielona Góra)
 Robert Kościecha (Unibax Toruń)
 Rune Holta (Caeleum Stal Gorzów)
 Janusz Kołodziej (Unia Tarnów ŻSSA)
 Adam Skórnicki (PSŻ Milion Team Poznań)
 Wiesław Jaguś (Unibax Toruń)
 Rafał Dobrucki (ZKŻ Kronopol Zielona Góra)
 Tomasz Jędrzejak (ATLAS Wrocław)
 Piotr Protasiewicz (ZKŻ Kronopol Zielona Góra)
 Krzysztof Buczkowski (Polonia Bydgoszcz)

Note: riders in bold type is Wrocław' rider.

Final participants 

 Sławomir Drabik (Unia Tarnów ŻSSA)
 Piotr Protasiewicz (ZKŻ Kronopol Zielona Góra)
 None
 Adrian Miedziński (Unibax Toruń)
 Tomasz Jędrzejak (Atlas Wrocław)
 Roman Povazhny (Marma Polskie Folie Rzeszów)
 Jarosław Hampel (Unia Leszno SSA)
 Norbert Kościuch (PSŻ Poznań)
 Damian Baliński (Unia Leszno SSA)
 Piotr Świderski (RKM Rybnik)
 Grzegorz Walasek (ZKŻ Kronopol Zielona Góra)
 Daniel Jeleniewski (Atlas Wrocław)
 Grzegorz Zengota (ZKŻ Kronopol Zielona Góra)
 Rafał Trojanowski (PSŻ Milion Team Poznań)
 Adam Skórnicki (PSŻ Milion Team Poznań)
 Jacek Rempała (Unia Tarnów ŻSSA)
 Patryk Pawlaszczyk (RKM Rybnik)

Heat details 
 2008-10-25, 19:00 CEST
 Refeere: Wojciech Grodzki

Heat after heat 
 Miedziński, Drabik, Protasiewicz
 Hampel, Kościuch, Jędrzejak, Povazhny
 Baliński, Świderski, Walasek, Jeleniewski (d1)
 Skórnicki, Rempała, Zengota, Trojanowski
 Baliński, Jędrzejak, Zengota, Drabik
 Protasiewicz, Świderski, Trojanowski, Povazhny
 Skórnicki, Hampel, Walasek
 Miedziński, Kościuch, Jeleniewski, Rempała
 Povazhny, Walasek, Rempała, Drabik
 Jeleniewski, Skórnicki, Protasiewicz, Jędrzejak
 Baliński, Kościuch, Trojanowski
 Miedziński, Hampel, Świderski, Zengota
 Hampel, Jeleniewski, Trojanowski, Drabik
 Zengota, Walasek, Protasiewicz, Kościuch
 Świderski, Jędrzejak, Rempała
 Baliński, Povazhny, Miedziński, Skórnicki
 Drabik, Kościuch, Świderski, Skórnicki
 Hampel, Baliński, Protasiewicz, Rempała
 Povazhny, Jeleniewski, Zengota
 Jędrzejak, Walasek, Miedziński, Trojanowski

References

See also 
 Speedway in Poland

Helmet Golden
2008